Get a Job is a 2016 American comedy film directed by Dylan Kidd and written by Kyle Pennekamp and Scott Turpel, about a group of friends who graduate from college and their efforts to secure employment. The film stars Miles Teller, Anna Kendrick, Brandon T. Jackson, Nicholas Braun, Christopher Mintz-Plasse, Marcia Gay Harden, Alison Brie and Bryan Cranston.

Shot in 2012, the film remained unreleased until March 25, 2016, when it received a limited and video on demand release by Lionsgate Premiere and CBS Films.

Plot
After recently graduating from college, millennial Will Davis is set to work in video production for LA Weekly but when he arrives for his first day, he is informed that the position promised to him during an internship was lost due to downsizing. He is obligated to find another position quickly to appease his parents, success-driven girlfriend Jillian, and to make rent for the house he shares with his three friends: Luke, Ethan, and Charlie.

Will asks his father Roger Davis for money, but Roger reveals that he recently lost the job he had for 30 years. In desperation, Will takes a position as the night manager for a disreputable motel. On his first night, Will allows a pimp named Skeezy D to use the motel for his prostitution ring causing him to lose his job when the police bust it. Meanwhile, his slacker roommates also struggle to fulfill their goals, Luke believes he has gained employment as a stock trader but instead is a poorly treated office clerk, Ethan fails to gain momentum with his questionable "iStalkU" mobile app idea, and stoner Charlie takes an undesirable job as a 6th grade chemistry teacher. Will interviews at a reputable executive job placement firm and impresses the hiring manager, gaining employment as a video resume creator. Roger meanwhile struggles to find new employment, believing his age is to blame. Will thrives and is soon offered a promotion after gaining the favor of his narcissistic manager, Katherine. Jillian loses her job and is forced to move in with Will and his friends.

A video of Skeezy D that Will uploaded to YouTube goes viral, attracting the attention of a startup company who offer him a job. Meanwhile, Luke becomes a stock trader but continues to struggle, Charlie begins coaching the school's basketball team, and Ethan fails to properly pitch his app idea to Warren Buffett. Roger takes refuge in a hipster coffee shop and becomes obsessed with gaining an interview at IBM. Unbeknownst to Roger, Will films him on a drunken rant about his job skills and later turns it into a video resume. Roger is nearly arrested for harassing the IBM hiring manager but is saved by Will and his friends, resulting in Roger gaining an interview and obtaining his dream employment.

With the support of Jillian, Will turns down the promotion and other job offers, instead opting to start his own video production company and he finds success. Luke eventually does well as a stock trader, Charlie realizes that the participation trophy ethos of his generation did more harm than good and finds new motivation, and Ethan finally achieves success with his app.

Cast

 Miles Teller as Will Davis
 Anna Kendrick as Jillian Stewart
 Brandon T. Jackson as Luke
 Christopher Mintz-Plasse as Ethan
 Nicholas Braun as Charlie
 Cameron Richardson as Tara the Stripper
 Marcia Gay Harden as Katherine Dunn
 Alison Brie as Tanya Sellers
 Bryan Cranston as Roger Davis
 Jorge Garcia as Fernando the Janitor
 John C. McGinley as Hank Diller
 John Cho as Brian Bender
 Greg Germann as Fernando the Accountant
 Bruce Davison as Lawrence Wilheimer
 Ethan Dizon as Kwan
 Jay Pharoah as Skeezy D
 Aaron Hill as Jason
 Marc Maron as Motel Manager
 Ravi Patel as Wick
 Jeryl Prescott as Assistant Principal
 Sean O'Bryan as Alan Fredricks (Wilheimer Client)
 Maximiliano Hernández as Businessman (Wilheimer Client)

Production
In January 2012, it was announced that Dylan Kidd was attached to direct the film from a screenplay by Kyle Pennekamp and Scott Turpel. It was also announced that Miles Teller, Anna Kendrick, Bryan Cranston, Christopher Mintz-Plasse, Jay Pharoah, and Jesse Eisenberg were all in negotiations to star in the film.

In March 2012, CBS Films confirmed the casting of Cranston, Kendrick, Teller, and Pharaoh. As well as announcing that Nicholas Braun, Alison Brie and Brandon T. Jackson had all been cast in the film. In March 2012, John Cho was confirmed to be in the film. Principal photography on the film began on March 12, 2012, in Los Angeles, California.

Release
After two years in September 2014, Anna Kendrick said the film may never see the light of day, due to distribution issues. The film was eventually released on March 25, 2016, in a limited release and through video on demand by CBS Films and Lionsgate Premiere.

Reception
 

Jon Frosch of The Hollywood Reporter gave the film a negative review writing, in comparison to We Are Your Friends: "Those guys might not have had college degrees, but they had attitude, hustle and a bit of soul — all things the shallow, insipid young characters in Get a Job, as well as the film itself, are sorely missing".  Mike D'Angelo of The A.V. Club wrote, "Honestly, it would probably have been better for almost everyone involved — especially Kidd — had Get A Job been left on the shelf permanently. All it can do now is embarrass some young actors who’ve already moved on to bigger and better things."

References

External links
 Official site
 
 

2016 films
2016 comedy films
American comedy films
Workplace comedy films
CBS Films films
Lionsgate films
2016 independent films
Films set in Los Angeles
2010s English-language films
2010s American films